The Biak glider (Petaurus biacensis) is a species of marsupial in the family Petauridae. It is endemic to the Schouten Islands in the western region of Papua Province, Indonesia. It was formerly considered to be a subspecies of Petaurus breviceps (sugar glider); there is still uncertainty regarding its status as a distinct species.

Distribution
Biak, Supiori and Owi isles.

References

External links
 Taxonomic status MSW - Current as of November 16, 2005 - Retrieved 07:58, 19 October 2012 (UTC)

Gliding possums
Marsupials of New Guinea
Mammals of Indonesia
Endemic fauna of the Biak–Numfoor rain forests
Biak
Schouten Islands
Least concern biota of Oceania
Mammals described in 1940
Taxonomy articles created by Polbot